General elections were held in Peru on 10 June 1962 to elect the President and both houses of Congress. Víctor Raúl Haya de la Torre of the Peruvian Aprista Party won the presidential election with 33% of the vote. However, this was below the constitutional requirement of one-third of the vote. The military, who were opposed to Haya, claimed that electoral fraud had been carried out in some districts, and the results were later annulled following a military coup on 18 July led by Ricardo Pérez Godoy.

Results

President

Senate

Chamber of Deputies

References

1962 in Peru
Elections in Peru
Peru
Presidential elections in Peru
Annulled elections
Election and referendum articles with incomplete results